Erik Josefsson (born February 18, 1987) is a Swedish professional ice hockey player. He is currently playing with Växjö Lakers in the Swedish Hockey League (SHL).

Awards and honours

References

External links

1987 births
Living people
Swedish ice hockey centres
Växjö Lakers players